Highway 716 is a highway in the Canadian province of Saskatchewan. It runs from Highway 2 to Highway 339 near Briercrest.

See also 
Roads in Saskatchewan
Transportation in Saskatchewan

References 

716